The Schmidt-Lademann House is a residential dwelling built 1958 in Floreat, a suburb of Perth, Western Australia. It is designed by Bulgarian-born architect Iwan Iwanoff and is an iconic example of mid-century modern architecture in Australia.

Design 
Siegfried Schmidt-Lademann became consul in Perth for Germany in 1957. He decided to build a residence for the consul in Perth which would be suitable for private living and for formal receptions. The house was the first independent design by the architect Iwan Iwanoff and was built in 1958. It became one of Iwanoff's notable projects.

In 1959 the German consulate in Perth was closed and the house had to be sold.

In contrast to the later more ornamented and playful designs of Iwanoff with some resemblance to Brutalist architecture, the light and clear design of this house is inspired by the Modernist architecture and Bauhaus ideas which Iwanoff was introduced to during his studies and work with Emil Freymuth in  Munich, Germany. Characteristic features of this partially single storey, partially double storey house are apart from the distinctive soaring skillion roof line the blending of natural materials granite, timber, copper. It features jarrah ceilings, blackbutt parquetry floors, wandoo staircase, maple cupboards, Corian benchtops, granite feature walls, a copper-surrounded fireplace. The jarrah framed window front on the south side opened a wide view on the Roscommon Reserve directly opposite. Overall the house shows Iwanoff's tendency to complex composition and with the wall at the southwest corner built from granite boulders Iwanoff already hints his interest in massive structures. The granite wall extends into the interior as a fireplace in the living area and a barbecue pit on the terrace in the west.

The design of 1958 included a living area on two levels separated by 2 steps into a dining area at the lower level and a sitting area with fireplace on the higher level, 3 bedrooms, a study on the gallery, a kitchen and 1.5 bathrooms.

History 
In 2003 the house received an extension filling out the previous "L" shape on the northwest side with a two-storey block adding an indoor/outdoor dining area on the ground floor and a bedroom and bathroom on the upper floor. This addition merges very well with the original design especially where it repeats the slanted roof.

The residence is listed in the Town of Cambridge Local Government Inventory of Heritage Places as place no. 39. 

It has changed ownership several times and increased in value each time:

Gallery

Footnotes

References

External links 
 Picture gallery, Schmidt-Lademann House at  Wikimedia Commons 

 Iwanoff's Cambridge Legacy Made by Town of Cambridge
 Interviews with Jutta Schmidt-Lademann and Michael Iwanoff about this house on vimeo, on facebook
 Schmidt-Lademann house
 6000TIMES: Perth, Australia : Best House in the Universe as We Know It
 Gallery of 23 recent pictures taken 2012

Modernist architecture in Australia
Architecture of Perth, Western Australia
Houses in Western Australia
Heritage places of Western Australia
Bauhaus